The 2010 Giro d'Italia began on May 8 in Amsterdam in the Netherlands, and ended on May 30 in Verona. Twenty-two professional cycling teams entered the race, who each entered a squad of nine riders. This group includes 15 UCI ProTour teams and seven UCI Professional Continental teams. Sixteen teams were guaranteed entry by a September 2008 contract between the UCI and the organizers of the season's three Grand Tours. Two from this group –  and  – declined to participate in the race, freeing up spots for two more teams. Two new teams joined the ProTour in 2010, but only one, participated in the Giro, as  opted instead to send their best riders to the 2010 Tour of California, which was partly concurrent to the Giro.

The other five Professional Continental teams had to be selected by race organizers.

By team

By rider

By nationality

References

External links 

cyclingnews.com

2010 Giro d'Italia
2010